Airport is a Roanoke, Virginia neighborhood located in north, central Roanoke surrounded roughly by Virginia State Route 118 to the south and by Interstate 581 to the west, centered on the Roanoke Regional Airport.  It borders the neighborhoods of Miller Court/Arrowood on the west, Roundhill on the south and Roanoke County on the north and east.

History
Annexed from Roanoke County in 1976, most development within the Airport neighborhood has been commercial in nature beginning with the opening of Crossroads Mall in 1961. Outside of the Roanoke Regional Airport property, the area remains primarily commercial and was also the location of the Advance Auto Parts corporate headquarters.

References

External links
  Williamson Road Area Plan which includes the Airport neighborhood

Neighborhoods in Roanoke, Virginia